The United States established diplomatic relations with Latvia on July 28, 1922. The U.S. Legation in Riga was officially established on November 13, 1922, and served as the headquarters for U.S. representation in the Baltics during the interwar era. The Soviet invasion forced the closure of the legation on September 5, 1940, but Latvian representation in the United States has continued uninterrupted for 85 years. The United States never recognized the forcible incorporation of Latvia into the U.S.S.R. and views the present government of Latvia as a legal continuation of the interwar republic.

Latvia and the United States have signed treaties on investment, trade, intellectual property protection, extradition, mutual legal assistance, and avoidance of double taxation. Latvia has enjoyed most-favored-nation treatment with the United States since December 1991.

According to the 2012 U.S. Global Leadership Report, 30% of Latvians approve of U.S. leadership, with 30% disapproving and 39% uncertain.

Principal U.S. Embassy Officials include:
 Ambassador Nancy Bikoff Pettit
 Deputy Chief of Mission Sharon Hudson-Dean

The U.S. Embassy in Latvia is located in Riga.

Country comparison

See also 
 Latvian Americans
 Foreign relations of the United States
 Foreign relations of Latvia
 United States Ambassador to Latvia

References

Further reading
 Andersons, Edgars, and M. G. Slavenas. "The Latvian and Lithuanian Press." in The Ethnic Press in the United States: A Historical Analysis and Handbook, edited by Sally M. Miller. (Greenwood Press, 1987).
 Kārklis, Maruta, Līga Streips, and Laimonis Streips. The Latvians in America, 1640–1973: A Chronology and Fact Book (Oceana Publications, 1974).
 Straumanis, Andris. "Latvian Americans." in  Gale Encyclopedia of Multicultural America, edited by Thomas Riggs, (3rd ed., vol. 3, Gale, 2014), pp. 65–78. Online
 "Latvians" in Stephan Thernstrom, Ann Orlov and Oscar Handlin, eds. Harvard Encyclopedia of American Ethnic Groups (1980) Online

External links
 
 History of Latvia - U.S. relations

 
Bilateral relations of the United States
United States